Ambaland Forces are an Ambazonian separatist militia. As of July 2018, it was described as a small "self-defense" group consisting of between 10 and 30 fighters. They tend to cooperate with larger militias, such as the Ambazonia Defence Forces, Southern Cameroons Defence Forces and the Tigers of Ambazonia.

See also
Communes of Cameroon

References 

 

Military of Ambazonia
National liberation movements in Africa
Secessionist organizations